Ceratodus (from  , 'horn' and   'tooth') is an extinct genus lungfish. It has been described as a "catch all", and a "form genus" used to refer to the remains (typically toothplates) of a variety of lungfish belonging to the extinct family Ceratodontidae. Fossil evidence dates back to the Early Triassic. A wide range of fossil species from different time periods have been found around the world in places such as the United States, Argentina, Greenland, England, Germany, Egypt, Madagascar, China, and Australia. Ceratodus is believed to have become extinct sometime around the beginning of the Eocene Epoch.

Species
 C. latissimus Agassiz, 1837 (type)
 C. eruciferus Cope, 1876 (nomen dubium)
 C. hieroglyphus Cope, 1876 (nomen dubium)
  C. robustus Knight, 1898
 C. africanus Haug, 1905
 C. humei Priem, 1914
 C. elegans Vollrath, 1923
 C. frazieri Ostrom, 1970
 C. gustasoni Kirkland, 1987
  C. fossanovum Kirkland, 1998
 C. stewarti  Milner and Kirkland, 2006
  C. texanus  Parris et al., 2011 
  C. carteri  Main et al., 2014
  C. kranzi  Frederickson et al., 2016 
 C. kirklandi Frederickson & Cifelli, 2016
 C. molossus Frederickson & Cifelli, 2016
 C. kempae Frederickson & Cifelli, 2016
 C. nirumbee Frederickson & Cifelli, 2016
 C. tunuensis Agnolin et al., 2018 
 C. guanganensis Wang et al., 2022

Gallery

References

 Ceratodus at The Paleobiology Database

Mesozoic bony fish
Prehistoric lungfish genera
Fossil taxa described in 1837
Paleocene fish
Cloverly fauna
Cretaceous fish
Jurassic fish
Triassic fish
Eocene fish
Taxa named by Louis Agassiz
Prehistoric fish of Asia